Deelen is a hamlet in the Dutch province of Gelderland. It is largely in the municipality of Ede, Netherlands, but a small part lies in the municipality of Arnhem.

It was first mentioned in the 13th century as Deijle, and means "parcel of ground".

Deelen is best known for the Deelen Air Base, a military airfield close to the village. The airport was built in 1913 as a subsidiary of Soesterberg Air Base. There is a museum on the airbase dedicated to its history.

Gallery

References 

Ede, Netherlands
Arnhem
Populated places in Gelderland